In chemistry, the alkoxy group is an alkyl group which is singularly bonded to oxygen; thus .  The range of alkoxy groups is vast, the simplest being methoxy. An ethoxy group is found in the organic compound ethyl phenyl ether (also known as ethoxybenzene). 

Related to alkoxy groups are aryloxy groups, which have an aryl group singularly bonded to oxygen such as the phenoxy group.

An alkoxy or aryloxy group bonded to an alkyl or aryl is an ether. If bonded to H it is an alcohol.

An alkoxide can refer to salts of alcohols, and they are ionic compounds containing an alkoxide ions ; it is a derivative of an alcohol where the hydrogen of the –OH group is replaced by a metal, for example sodium salt of ethanol is sodium ethoxide, containing ethoxide anions  and sodium cations .

References

 
Functional groups